The following outline is provided as an overview of and topical guide to Latvia:

Latvia – sovereign country located in the Baltic region of Northern Europe.  Latvia is bordered to the north by Estonia (343 km), to the south by Lithuania (588 km), and to the east both by Belarus (141 km) and the Russian Federation (276 km).  Across the Baltic Sea to the west lies Sweden. The territory of Latvia covers 64,589 km² and is influenced by a temperate seasonal climate.

The Latvians are a Baltic people closely related to the Lithuanians, with the Latvian language sharing many similarities to Lithuanian. Today the Latvians and Lithuanians are the only surviving members of the Baltic peoples and Baltic languages of the Indo-European family. The modern name of Latvia is thought to originate from the ancient Latvian name Latvji, which may have originated from the word Latve which is a name of the river that presumably flowed through what is now eastern Latvia.

Latvia is a democratic parliamentary republic and is divided into 26 districts. The capital and largest city is Riga. Latvia has been a member of the United Nations since 17 September 1991, of the European Union since 1 May 2004 and of NATO since 29 March 2004.

General reference 

 Pronunciation: 
 Common English country name:  Latvia
 Official English country name:  The Republic of Latvia
 Common endonym(s): Latvija
 Official endonym(s): Latvija
 Adjectival(s): Latvian
 Demonym(s): Latvian
 Etymology: Name of Latvia
 International rankings of Latvia
 ISO country codes:  LV, LVA, 428
 ISO region codes:  See ISO 3166-2:LV
 Internet country code top-level domain:  .lv

Geography of Latvia 

 Latvia is: a country
 Location:
 Northern Hemisphere and Eastern Hemisphere
 Eurasia
 Europe
 Northern Europe
 Eastern Europe
 Time zone:  Eastern European Time (UTC+02), Eastern European Summer Time (UTC+03)
 Extreme points of Latvia
 High:  Gaizinkalns 
 Low:  Baltic Sea 0 m
 Land boundaries:  1,382 km
 576 km
 343 km
 292 km
 171 km
 Coastline:  Baltic Sea 498 km
 Population of Latvia: 2,068,000 (February, 2012)  - 144th most populous country

 Area of Latvia: 64,589 km2
 Atlas of Latvia

Environment of Latvia 

 Climate of Latvia
 Renewable energy in Latvia
 Geology of Latvia
 Protected areas of Latvia
 Biosphere reserves in Latvia
 National parks of Latvia
 Wildlife of Latvia
 Fauna of Latvia
 Birds of Latvia
 Mammals of Latvia

Natural geographic features of Latvia 
 Rivers of Latvia
 World Heritage Sites in Latvia

Ecoregions of Latvia 

List of ecoregions in Latvia
 Ecoregions in Latvia

Administrative divisions of Latvia 

Administrative divisions of Latvia
 Districts of Latvia
 Subdivisions of Latvia
 Planning regions of Latvia

Regions of Latvia 

Regions of Latvia
(current article is actually about the provinces of Latvia. The new Latvian regions were developed in accordance with EU-standardisation)

Districts of Latvia 

Districts of Latvia

Subdivisions of Latvia 

Subdivisions of Latvia

Municipalities of Latvia 

 Capital of Latvia: Riga
 List of cities in Latvia

Demography of Latvia 

Demographics of Latvia

Government and politics of Latvia 

Politics of Latvia
 Form of government: Representative democracy; unitary parliamentary republic
 Capital of Latvia: Riga
 Elections in Latvia
 Political parties in Latvia

Branches of the government of Latvia 

Government of Latvia

Executive branch of the government of Latvia 
 Head of state: President of Latvia, Egils Levits
 Head of government: Prime Minister of Latvia, Arturs Krišjānis Kariņš
 Cabinet of Latvia

Legislative branch of the government of Latvia 

 Parliament of Latvia (unicameral)

Judicial branch of the government of Latvia 

Court system of Latvia
 Supreme Court of Latvia

Foreign relations of Latvia 

Foreign relations of Latvia
 Diplomatic missions in Latvia
 Diplomatic missions of Latvia

International organization membership 
The Republic of Latvia is a member of:

Australia Group
Baltic Assembly (BA)
Bank for International Settlements (BIS)
Council of Europe (CE)
Council of the Baltic Sea States (CBSS)
Euro-Atlantic Partnership Council (EAPC)
European Bank for Reconstruction and Development (EBRD)
European Investment Bank (EIB)
European Union (EU)
Food and Agriculture Organization (FAO)
International Atomic Energy Agency (IAEA)
International Bank for Reconstruction and Development (IBRD)
International Civil Aviation Organization (ICAO)
International Criminal Court (ICCt)
International Criminal Police Organization (Interpol)
International Development Association (IDA)
International Federation of Red Cross and Red Crescent Societies (IFRCS)
International Finance Corporation (IFC)
International Hydrographic Organization (IHO)
International Labour Organization (ILO)
International Maritime Organization (IMO)
International Mobile Satellite Organization (IMSO)
International Monetary Fund (IMF)
International Olympic Committee (IOC)
International Organization for Migration (IOM)
International Organization for Standardization (ISO) (correspondent)

International Red Cross and Red Crescent Movement (ICRM)
International Telecommunication Union (ITU)
International Trade Union Confederation (ITUC)
Inter-Parliamentary Union (IPU)
Multilateral Investment Guarantee Agency (MIGA)
Nordic Investment Bank (NIB)
North Atlantic Treaty Organization (NATO)
Nuclear Suppliers Group (NSG)
Organisation internationale de la Francophonie (OIF) (observer)
Organization for Security and Cooperation in Europe (OSCE)
Organisation for the Prohibition of Chemical Weapons (OPCW)
Organization of American States (OAS) (observer)
Permanent Court of Arbitration (PCA)
Schengen Convention
United Nations (UN)
United Nations Conference on Trade and Development (UNCTAD)
United Nations Educational, Scientific, and Cultural Organization (UNESCO)
Universal Postal Union (UPU)
Western European Union (WEU) (associate partner)
World Customs Organization (WCO)
World Federation of Trade Unions (WFTU)
World Health Organization (WHO)
World Intellectual Property Organization (WIPO)
World Meteorological Organization (WMO)
World Tourism Organization (UNWTO)
World Trade Organization (WTO)

Law and order in Latvia 

Law of Latvia
 Capital punishment in Latvia
 Constitution of Latvia
 Crime in Latvia
 Human rights in Latvia
Latvian citizenship law
 LGBT rights in Latvia
 Freedom of religion in Latvia
 Law enforcement in Latvia

Military of Latvia 

Military of Latvia
 Command
 Commander-in-chief:
 Ministry of Defence of Latvia
 Forces
 Army of Latvia
 Navy of Latvia
 Air Force of Latvia
 Special forces of Latvia
 Military history of Latvia
 Military ranks of Latvia

Local government in Latvia 

Local government in Latvia

History of Latvia 

History of Latvia
Timeline of the history of Latvia
Current events of Latvia
 Military history of Latvia

Culture of Latvia 

Culture of Latvia
 Architecture of Latvia
 Cuisine of Latvia
 Festivals in Latvia
 Humor in Latvia
 Languages of Latvia
 Media in Latvia
 National symbols of Latvia
 Coat of arms of Latvia
 Flag of Latvia
 National anthem of Latvia
 People of Latvia
 Prostitution in Latvia
 Public holidays in Latvia
 Records of Latvia
 Religion in Latvia
 Christianity in Latvia
 Roman Catholicism in Latvia
 Latvian Orthodox Church
 Islam in Latvia
 Judaism in Latvia
 Sikhism in Latvia
 World Heritage Sites in Latvia

Art in Latvia 
 Art in Latvia
 Cinema of Latvia
 Literature of Latvia
 Music of Latvia
 Television in Latvia
 Theatre in Latvia

Sports in Latvia 

Sports in Latvia
Football in Latvia
Ice Hockey in Latvia
Basketball in Latvia
Athletics in Latvia
Tennis in Latvia
Cycling in Latvia
Floorball in Latvia
Latvia at the Olympics

Economy and infrastructure of Latvia 

Economy of Latvia
 Economic rank, by nominal GDP (2007): 82nd (eighty-second)
 Agriculture in Latvia
 Banking in Latvia
 National Bank of Latvia
 Communications in Latvia
 Internet in Latvia
 Telephone numbers in Latvia
 Companies of Latvia
Currency of Latvia: Euro
ISO 4217: EUR
 Energy in Latvia
 Energy policy of Latvia
 Oil industry in Latvia
 Health care in Latvia
 Mining in Latvia
 Latvian Real Estate (needs fixing)
 Riga Stock Exchange
 Tourism in Latvia
 Transport in Latvia
 Airports in Latvia
 Rail transport in Latvia
 Roads in Latvia

Education in Latvia 

Education in Latvia

Civil society organisations in Latvia 
Latvian Medical Foundation
School of Young Geographers

See also 

Latvia
Index of Latvia-related articles
List of international rankings
Member state of the European Union
Member state of the North Atlantic Treaty Organization
Member state of the United Nations
Outline of Europe
Outline of geography

References

External links 

The President of Latvia
National Statistics Agency — Statistical information on economic, demographic, social, and environmental phenomena and processes of Latvia
Latvia from The World Factbook
Virtual World of Latvia (Latvian Institute)
The Latvian Institute — Publications on Latvian society, economy, culture and history

Latvia